The 2017 Men's Volleyball Pro Challenge was the 7th season of the League since its establishment in 2011. It is the feeder league for the Volleyball Thailand League.  A total of 7 teams competed in the league this season.

Team
 Cosmo Chiang Rai VC
 Khon Kaen Municipality VC
 Nakhonnont VC
 RSU VC
 Sisaket
 Sponxel–MS VC
 Strong Wings–Chiang Mai

Ranking

|}

Results

Week 1

|}

Week 2

|}

Week 3

|}

Week 4

|}

Week 5

|}

Final standing

See also 
 2017 Women's Volleyball Pro Challenge

External links
 

2017
Pro Challenge